The 1995 Idaho Vandals football team represented the University of Idaho in the 1995 NCAA Division I-AA football season. The Vandals, led by first-year head coach Chris Tormey, were members of the Big Sky Conference and played their home games at the Kibbie Dome, an indoor facility on campus in Moscow, Idaho. Idaho finished the regular season at 6–4 and 4–3 in the Big Sky, their final season in the conference for more than two decades.

Idaho defeated rival Boise State for the thirteenth time in 

Since 1978, the Vandals' football uniforms made prominent use of yellow gold  which continued through this season. With the move to up Division I-A in 1996, the shade of gold was changed

Division I-AA playoffs
After a slow start, the Vandals defeated the top teams in the conference to make the I-AA playoffs for the fourth consecutive season, and the tenth time in eleven seasons under four head  For the second straight year, Idaho traveled to Louisiana to play McNeese State in the first round; the Cowboys were top-ranked this year and won again, this time by   Conference champion Montana lost to Idaho in the Kibbie Dome in mid-season, then went on to win the national championship; it was the Vandals' first win over the Griz since 1990.

Notable players and coaches
Junior defensive end Ryan Phillips was a four-year starter; he moved to outside linebacker as a senior in 1996, and was selected in the third round of the 1997 NFL Draft by the New York Giants. He played five seasons in the NFL, including Super Bowl XXXV in January 2001.

Future Idaho head coach Nick Holt stayed on the staff as defensive coordinator. New head coach Tormey was an alumnus from Spokane who played defense for the Vandals in the mid-1970s, and was the defensive line coach under Dennis Erickson in 1982 and 1983. He had spent the previous eleven seasons at Washington in Seattle under head coaches Don James and Jim Lambright. First-year offensive coordinator George Yarno moved over from neighboring Washington State, his alma mater, where he was the offensive line coach under Mike Price.

Schedule

Roster

References

External links
Gem of the Mountains: 1996 University of Idaho yearbook – 1995 football season
Idaho Argonaut – student newspaper – 1995 editions

Idaho
Idaho Vandals football seasons
Idaho Vandals football